"Hello, Summertime" is a song written by Bill Backer, Billy Davis, Roger Cook and Roger Greenaway. Recorded by American singer Bobby Goldsboro, his 1974 release peaked at No. 8 on the Billboard Adult Contemporary chart, and hit No. 14 in the United Kingdom in September 1974.

References

1974 singles
United Artists Records singles
1974 songs
Bobby Goldsboro songs
Songs written by Billy Davis (songwriter)
Songs written by Roger Cook (songwriter)
Songs written by Roger Greenaway
Song recordings produced by Bob Montgomery (songwriter)